Changing Partners is a 2017 Filipino independent musical drama film directed by Dan Villegas, starring Agot Isidro, Jojit Lorenzo, Sandino Martin, and Anna Luna. Based on the Palanca Award-winning musical play by Vincent de Jesus, the adaptation tells the story of couple Alex and Cris–their love relationship and at the period of breaking up. The film tells the story in four gender bending relationship variations.

The film premiered on November 14, 2017 at the 2017 Cinema One Originals Film Festival, where it receive eight awards, including Best Director, Best Music, and Best Editing. It was commercially released by Star Cinema on January 31, 2018, in selected theaters nationwide.

Cast
Agot Isidro as Alex
Jojit Lorenzo as Alex
Sandino Martin as Cris
Anna Luna as Cris

Nicco Manalo and Vincent de Jesus also made their cameo appearances in the film.

Soundtrack
The soundtrack album was digitally released via iTunes on June 1, 2017. The pop version of the soundtrack was released by Star Music on January 26, 2018. It features Jona, KZ Tandingan, Daryl Ong, and Khalil Ramos respectively.

Release
Changing Partners was screened at the 2018 CinemAsia Film Festival in Amsterdam, Netherlands.

The film was released and made available to stream on AppleTV+ and IWantTFC respectively.

Awards and nominations

References

External links
 
 

2017 films
Philippine musical comedy-drama films
2017 romantic comedy-drama films
2010s musical comedy-drama films
2017 LGBT-related films
Philippine LGBT-related films
Philippine romantic comedy-drama films
2017 comedy films
2017 drama films